Aboubacar Diarra (born 22 May 1993) is a Malian footballer who plays as a midfielder, most recently for Tala'ea El Gaish in Egypt.

Career statistics

International

Honours

Club
Stade Malien
 Malian Première Division: 2016
Al-Shorta
 Iraqi Super Cup: 2019

References

External links

1993 births
Living people
Malian footballers
Malian expatriate footballers
Stade Malien players
ENPPI SC players
Al-Shorta SC players
Tala'ea El Gaish SC players
Egyptian Premier League players
Association football midfielders
Mali international footballers
Malian expatriate sportspeople in Egypt
Malian expatriate sportspeople in Iraq
Expatriate footballers in Iraq
Expatriate footballers in Egypt
21st-century Malian people